The 2018 BDO World Trophy was a major darts tournament run by the British Darts Organisation. It was host between 30 May and 3 June 2018 at Preston Guild Hall, Preston, England.

Peter Machin and Aileen de Graaf were defending their champions, after beating Martin Phillips (10–8) and Anastasia Dobromyslova (6–2) respectively in the final of last year's edition.

Machin lost to Michael Unterbuchner 7–1 in the Quarter-finals. De Graaf lost in the First round 4–3 to Maria O'Brien.

Unterbuchner went on to lose in the final of the men’s event to Glen Durrant (10–7), who has now completed the ‘triple crown’ of BDO majors. In the women’s competition, Fallon Sherrock won her second televised title with a 6–3 win over Lorraine Winstanley.

Men

Qualifiers

Top 16 in BDO Rankings
  Glen Durrant (winner)
  Mark McGeeney (second round)
  Scott Mitchell (second round)
  Jim Williams (semi-finals)
  Scott Waites (first round)
  Ross Montgomery (semi-finals)
  Wesley Harms (second round)
  Willem Mandigers (first round)
  Martin Phillips (first round)
  James Hurrell (first round)
  Gary Robson (first round)
  Andy Baetens (second round)
  Conan Whitehead (first round)
  Kyle McKinstry (quarter-finals)
  Dean Reynolds (first round)
  Jeffrey Sparidaans (first round)

17–25 in BDO Rankings

WDF regional Qualifiers
 Pengiran Mohamed (first round)
 Justin Thompson (first round)

Play-Offs Qualifiers
 William Borland (second round)
 Dafydd Edwards (first round)
 Ryan Hogarth (second round)
 Jonathan Worsley (first round)

Last Year Winner not Qualified
 Peter Machin (quarter-finals)

Draw bracket

Women

Qualifiers

Top 8 in BDO Rankings
  Lorraine Winstanley (runner-up)
  Aileen de Graaf (first round)
  Deta Hedman (first round)
  Lisa Ashton (quarter-finals)
  Anastasia Dobromyslova (semi-finals)
  Sharon Prins (quarter-finals)
  Fallon Sherrock (winner)
  Trina Gulliver (first round)

9–14 in BDO Rankings

Play-Offs Qualifiers
 Rhian O'Sullivan (first round)
 Roz Bulmer (semi-finals)

Draw bracket

References 

BDO World Trophy
BDO World Trophy
BDO World Trophy
Sport in Preston
BDO World Trophy
BDO World Trophy